The 2008 Tour of Britain was a UCI 2.1 category race of eight stages from 7 September till 14 September 2008. The race was the fifth edition of the latest version of the Tour of Britain. It formed part of the 2007–08 UCI Europe Tour. The race begun with a circuit stage in London and ended in Liverpool.

Participating teams
The 16 teams which participated in the race were:

UCI ProTour Teams
SAX – 
THR – 

UCI Professional Continental Teams
AGR – 
BAR – 
GRM – 
LPR – 
TSV – 

UCI Continental Teams
CTV – Pinarello – CandiTV
MTN – 
PRT – 
PCA – Plowman Craven Cycling Team
RCS – 
RRC – 
SAI – SouthAustralia.com–AIS
SKT – 

Other
Great Britain

Stages

Stage 1
7 September 2008 – London to London,

Stage 2
8 September 2008 – Milton Keynes to Newbury,

Stage 3
9 September 2008 – Chard to Burnham-on-Sea,

Stage 4
10 September 2008 – Worcester to Stoke-on-Trent,

Stage 5
11 September 2008 – Hull to Dalby Forest,

Stage 6
12 September 2008 – Darlington to Newcastle/Gateshead,

Stage 7
13 September 2008 – Glasgow Green to Drumlanrig Castle,

Stage 8
14 September 2008 – Blackpool to Liverpool, 
The final stage departed from Blackpool and finished in Liverpool with six laps of a city centre circuit. Alessandro Petacchi took the stage win, his third of the tour, whilst Geoffroy Lequatre finished third to win the general classification.

Classification leadership

References

External links

 Official Website

2008
2008 in road cycling
2008 in British sport
September 2008 sports events in the United Kingdom
2008 sports events in London